The 1986 Canada Dry Scottish Professional Championship was a professional non-ranking snooker tournament, which took place between 10 and 16 March 1986 at Marco's Leisure Centre in Edinburgh, Scotland.

Stephen Hendry won the title by beating Matt Gibson 10–5 in the final. His first ever in his professional career.

Qualifying round
 Stephen Hendry 6–1 Bert Demarco

Main draw

References

Scottish Professional Championship
Scottish Professional Championship
Scottish Professional Championship
Scottish Professional Championship
Sports competitions in Edinburgh